Line 1 (Linea Uno in Italian) is the first underground rapid transit line built in Milan, Italy. It is part of the Milan Metro and it is operated by ATM. Works on the line began in 1957, and the first part was opened on 1 November 1964, running from Sesto Marelli to Lotto station. The line is also called Red Line (Linea Rossa in Italian), as it is visually identified by red signs. Due to its premiership, the line gave its red color to the Milan Metro logo.

Route
The line runs underground from the northern suburb of Sesto San Giovanni to the city centre, then to the western district with two different branches, one northwest to Rho, the other to the west to Bisceglie.

Key points served by the line are Duomo, considered the center of Milan; Castello Sforzesco (with Cairoli station); Cadorna, one of the busiest stations in Milan and in Italy; Corso Buenos Aires (with stations Porta Venezia, Lima and Loreto), an important shopping street; and Rho Fiera, one of the largest fairgrounds in the world.

History

On 6 April 1952 the city administration asked for a project of a metro system and on 6 October 1955 a new company, Metropolitana Milanese, was created to manage the construction of the new infrastructure.  The project was funded with ₤ 500 million from the municipality and the rest from a loan. The construction site of the first line was opened in viale Monte Rosa on 4 May 1957. Stations on the new line were designed by Franco Albini-Franca Helg architecture studio. Bob Noorda designed the famous wayfinding and signage system.

At first, stations were designed without the mezzanine floor. However, these were added to the final design to allow street crossing and the use of gates to collect tickets.

The line from Lotto to Sesto Marelli (21 stations) opened on 1 November 1964, after seven years of construction works.

Rolling stock
There are 4 types of trains running on the line: the original first series trains, revamped original trains, AnsaldoBreda Meneghino trains and the new  train introduced in 2015. The entire line is electrified by means of a third or fourth rail at 750 V DC.

Among the 63 trains running on the line, 20 entered service between 1964 (opening of the line) and 1970. Those trains are planned to be replaced by new Meneghino trains in the next few years. There are 17 Meneghino trains already operational as of March 2012.

Extension
An extension towards the north from Sesto Primo Maggio to Cinisello/Bettola is currently under construction. It is expected to be completed by 2023. The total cost will be €206 million.

An extension of the western branch from Bisceglie towards the city limits has been approved. The new stations will be located at Baggio, via Valsesia and at Quartiere Olmi. The national government will provide €210 million, while the total cost is estimated at €350 million.

Gallery

Notes

References
Milan Metro Map
News and hystorical info about Milan Metro and is architecture

1
M1 Milan Metro
Milan Metro Line 1